The Florida scrub lizard (Sceloporus woodi) is a species of lizard in the family Phrynosomatidae. The species is endemic to Florida, the United States.

Etymology
The specific name, woodi, is in honor of taxidermist Nelson R. Wood (died 1920) of the Smithsonian Institution who collected the holotype.

Description

The adult Florida scrub lizard is about 5 inches (13 cm) in total length (including tail). It is gray or brownish with a longitudinal brown stripe down each side of the body. The male has turquoise patches on the throat and belly. The female usually lacks the throat patches but may have lighter patches on the abdomen.

Reproduction
Courtship and mating of S. woodi occur in spring. The female buries up to 5 clutches of 2 to 8 eggs each. Eggs take about 75 days to hatch, probably depending on ambient temperature. The last hatchlings of the year emerge in November. The lizard becomes sexually mature in 10 to 11 months.

Habitat
The preferred natural habitat of S. woodi is Florida scrub, including evergreen oak and sand pine scrub. It is found less often in the ecotone between scrub and sandhill habitat, flatwoods, and citrus groves. It is most common in dry habitat with open areas for basking and nesting with nearby pines or oaks for shelter. A closed canopy makes the habitat unsuitable.

Geographic range and conservation status
S. woodi has a disjunct distribution with four main population areas, the Atlantic coast scrubs, the Gulf Coast scrubs, the inland central peninsula, and Ocala National Forest and environs. It occurs on the Lake Wales Ridge. It is common in the Ocala National Forest, but it is slowly declining in most of its range due to loss of habitat. It was more widespread before the intensive development of Florida's scrub zones and sandy ridges. Habitat loss to development, including the establishment of citrus groves, has reduced populations. Fire suppression causes habitat changes such as closure of the canopy, which eliminates the open spaces required by the species.

This species occurs in widely spaced patches of a habitat type that is naturally fragmented, and it does not disperse far from its natal area. The main population groups have remained separate for many thousands of years, causing isolation that has led to the development of high genetic diversity in the species as a whole. During conservation efforts, it is important to maintain such diversity.

References

Further reading
Behler JL, King FW (1979). The Audubon Society Field Guide to North American Reptiles and Amphibians. New York: Alfred A. Knopf. 743 pp. . (Sceloporus woodi, pp. 531–532 + Plate 376).
Conant R (1975). A Field Guide to Reptiles and Amphibians of Eastern and Central North America. Boston: Houghton Mifflin. xviii + 429 pp. + Plates 1-48.  (hardcover),  (paperback). (Sceloporus woodi, p. 105 + Plate 16 + Map 68).
Powell R, Conant R, Collins, JT (2016). Peterson Field Guide to Reptiles and Amphibians of Eastern and Central North America, Fourth Edition. Boston and New York: Houghton Mifflin Harcourt. xiv + 494 pp., 47 color plates, 207 figures. . (Sceloporus woodi, p. 299 + Plate 27).
Smith HM, Brodie ED Jr (1982). Reptiles of North America: A Guide to Field Identification. New York: Golden Press. 240 pp.  (paperback),  (hardcover). (Sceloporus woodi, pp. 122–123).
Stejneger L (1918). "Description of a New Snapping Turtle and a New Lizard from Florida". Proceedings of the Biological Society of Washington 31: 89-92. (Sceloporus woodi, new species, pp. 90–92).

Sceloporus
Reptiles of the United States
Endemic fauna of Florida
Reptiles described in 1918
Taxa named by Leonhard Stejneger